Edward Hyndman Beckles (1816 – 5 December 1902) was the Anglican Bishop of Sierra Leone from 1860 until 1869.

Beckles was born in Barbados in 1816, educated at Codrington College Barbados, ordained deacon in 1843 and priest in 1844. He started as curate of Holy Trinity, Port of Spain, then served for six years at St. Michael, Diego Martin, Trinidad, where he was also chaplain to the forces. After a brief period in the United Kingdom, where he was curate of London-churches in Mile End and Lisson Grove, he returned to the West Indies in 1853 as rector of St Peter's, Saint Kitts.

He was nominated Bishop of Sierra Leone in 1860, but resigned in 1869 and moved to the United Kingdom. After resigning his episcopal see he was Minister of Berkeley Chapel, Mayfair, Rector of Wootton, Kent and finally Vicar of St Peter, Bethnal Green from 1873.

At some point he gained a Doctorate of Divinity (DD).

Beckles died on 5 December 1902.

References

1816 births
Colony of Barbados people
Sierra Leonean clergy
Sierra Leonean Anglicans
19th-century Anglican bishops in Sierra Leone
British Anglican missionaries
Anglican missionaries in Sierra Leone
Anglican bishops of Sierra Leone
1902 deaths